George Anthony Garrett (born 4 March 2000) is an English cricketer. He made his first-class debut on 18 August 2019, for Warwickshire in the 2019 County Championship. He made his Twenty20 debut on 27 August 2019, for Warwickshire in the 2019 t20 Blast. He made his List A debut on 22 July 2021, for Warwickshire in the 2021 Royal London One-Day Cup.

References

External links
 

2000 births
Living people
English cricketers
Warwickshire cricketers
People from Harpenden
English cricketers of the 21st century